The table below lists the judgments of the Constitutional Court of South Africa delivered in 2010.

The members of the court during 2010 were Chief Justice Sandile Ngcobo, Deputy Chief Justice Dikgang Moseneke, and judges Edwin Cameron, Johan Froneman, Chris Jafta, Sisi Khampepe, Mogoeng Mogoeng, Bess Nkabinde, Thembile Skweyiya, Johann van der Westhuizen and Zak Yacoob.

References
 
 

2010
Constitutional Court
Constitutional Court of South Africa